Ganamela is a 1991 Indian Malayalam-language film directed and produced by Ambili and written by Jagadish. The film stars Mukesh, Geetha Vijayan, Jagathy Sreekumar and Innocent. The film has musical score by Raveendran, A. T. Ummer and Jerry Amaldev.

Plot

Venugopal is the lead singer of music band "Hits Orchestra". The troop consists of keyboard player Tony Fernandez, Tabalist Shakkeer Bhai, guitarist Kannan and violinist Babu. Despite performing well, the troop struggle financially.

Venugopal falls in love with Lakshmi, the daughter of rich entrepreneur Sreedhara Panikkar. One night, Panikkar and his associates, Ganapathi and his car driver Appukuttan, decide to assault Venugopal. Venugopal plays dead using blood-coloured dye, which leads them to believe he has been murdered. They seal him in a box and decide to bury him in their house, without realising that his friends are playing close by and assist him to escape. Later, Venugopal returns claiming to be a Central Bureau of Investigation officer named Krishnakumar and Venugopal's twin brother, along with his helper, Mukundan. He accuses Panikkar of being the murderer, and threatens him with the death penalty. Panikkar falls unconscious, and Venugopal later forgives him. However, Ganapathi is planning something wicked.

Cast

Soundtrack
The music was composed by Raveendran, A. T. Ummer and Jerry Amaldev and the lyrics were written by Sasi Chittanjoor and Kaithapram.

References

External links
 

1991 films
1990s Malayalam-language films
Films scored by Jerry Amaldev
Films scored by Raveendran
Films scored by A. T. Ummer